Linnastaadion may refer to:

Elva linnastaadion
Haapsalu linnastaadion
Jõhvi linnastaadion
Kuressaare linnastaadion
Paide linnastaadion
Rakvere linnastaadion
Valga linnastaadion
Viljandi linnastaadion